The Camp del Guinardó was a football stadium in the city of Barcelona, Spain, located in the neighborhood of El Guinardó. It served as the home ground of the club CE Europa between 1923 and 1931. It had a capacity for approximately 19,000 spectators, 2,000 of them seated. In 1960 the stadium was renamed Mostajo Velodrome, until its definitive closure in 1964.

History
CE Europa had several short-lived football fields in the 1910s, but due to the rise of the club they began to look for more durable land that could be better suited to their growing needs, and so, at the beginning of the 1920s, the construction of a new stadium began in an area that they bought (712,000 square spans) between Lepanto and Sardeña streets, on Travessera de Gràcia, near the previous field of the street, the Camp de la Indústria and the current Nou Sardenya. It was inaugurated on 8 December 1923, with a friendly match between CE Europa and the Hungarian Szombathelyi Haladás, which ended in a 1-1 draw.

In 1929, CE Europa was one of the ten founding members of La Liga, and during three seasons, the Camp del Guinardó hosted the CE Europa matches in Spain's top flight.

In 1964 it ceased its activity and was demolished as a result of the urban growth of the city to build houses.

References

Bibliography
 

Defunct football venues in Spain
CE Europa
Football venues in Barcelona
Sports venues completed in 1923
Sports venues demolished in 1964